Inger Nordbø (née Kragh; 27 June 1915 – 29 November 2004) was a Danish/Norwegian sports swimmer and diver. She was born in Copenhagen, and became Norwegian citizen from 1935. She competed at the 1936 Summer Olympics in Berlin, where she finished eleventh in springboard and 12th in platform. She competed at the 1948 Summer Olympics in London. She is credited with organizing synchronized swimming in Norway, and was an honorary member of Oslo IL.

References

1915 births
2004 deaths
Swimmers from Copenhagen
Norwegian female swimmers
Norwegian female divers
Olympic divers of Norway
Divers at the 1936 Summer Olympics
Divers at the 1948 Summer Olympics